The Puskwaskau River is a short river in Northern Alberta, Canada. It is a tributary of the Smoky River flowing westwards in the Peace River Country. Its waters flow through the Smoky River, Peace River, Slave River, Great Slave Lake and Mackenzie River into the Arctic Ocean.

The name of the river originates from the Cree word for short grass. The Puskwaskau Formation, a stratigraphical unit of the Western Canadian Sedimentary Basin, was named for the river.

Course
It flows north-west and receives the waters of Little Puskwaskau River before being crossed by Highway 676.

Tributaries
Puskwaskau Lake
Little Puskwaskau River

See also
List of rivers of Alberta

References

Rivers of Alberta